Practical Aesthetics is an acting technique originally conceived by David Mamet and William H. Macy, based on the teachings of Stanislavsky, Sanford Meisner, and the Stoic philosopher Epictetus.

Technique
Practical Aesthetics is based on the practice of breaking down a scene using a four-step analysis that entails the following:

1) The "Literal": The essential and most basic, uninterpretive, description of what is taking place. 'What is Literally happening for your character within the scene?'. For example; 'My character is literally proposing marriage to their partner of 6 months'

2) The "Want":  What does one character ultimately want the other character to say or do. "What does my character want from the other person within the scene?". For example; 'I want the other character to accept my marriage proposal"

3) The "Essential Action": A universal human desire that relates to the specific and essential nature of what your character wants within the scene. In this step, you must distill the given circumstances and the actions of your character, given to you by the playwright, to a universal human desire that underlies the text. For example; if your 'Want' is "I want the other character to accept my marriage proposal" the 'Universal Human Desire' or 'Essential Action' underlying that specific 'Want' could be 'To get my soulmate to take a brave step'. 

4) The "As If": This relates the "essential action" to the actor's own life. (Often the most difficult step of Analysis)

For example: "Essential Action" –  To retrieve what is rightfully mine. "As If" – It's as if my girlfriend has taken away my favorite album that I was going to give as a gift. I need to retrieve it because it is mine.

Unlike other acting techniques, this step is NOT a memory device. In Practical Aesthetics actors are taught that using the memory of past experiences hinders the truth of the moment within a scene because you already know how that memory ends, there is a resolution inherently tied to that memory. Therefore if you choose to use memory to replicate an emotional response within the scene, you have to ignore the resolution or pretend as if it has not occurred, you are playing a 'double fiction'. Firstly you are playing the fiction of the scene and secondly, you are acting as if you don't know the outcome of the memory you are drawing an emotional response from.

Therefore the Practical Aesthetic 'As If' is something that could feasibly happen in your life, that has not yet happened, that produces a galvanized response within you; a spark to involve the actor in the scene. It helps the actor escape the fiction, find the truth, and apply it elsewhere. 

This technique is aimed at making the experience of acting entirely based on the will of the actor. It is in response to "The Method, " which some believe uses more introverted and self-based practices. The Practical Aesthetic asks an actor only to commit his will to the pursuit of an action based on the other actor.

Practitioners
Famous practitioners of Practical Aesthetics include:  William H Macy, Felicity Huffman, Rose Byrne, Jessica Alba, Rhea Seehorn, and Clark Gregg.

See also
GOTE: This acronym (Goal, Obstacle, Tactics, and Expectation) was devised by Robert Cohen to remind his students of his acting "method" – a method often linked with practical aesthetics.

"To my knowledge, the GOTE system has never been directly linked with Practical Aesthetics, and is not a formal part of the Practical Aesthetics curriculum. Thank God." – Lee Michael Cohn, co-author of A Practical Handbook for the Actor

References

Bibliography
Bruder, Melissa, et al. (1986). A Practical Handbook for the Actor. New York: Vintage Books. 
Cohen, Robert (1978). Acting Power. New York: McGraw-Hill. 
Cohen, Robert (2003). Acting Professionally: Raw Facts About Careers in Acting. New York: McGraw-Hill. 
Mamet, David (1999). True and False: Heresy and Common Sense for the Actor. New York: Vintage Books.

External links
Atlantic Theater Company
Atlantic Acting School

Acting techniques